The Daf-9 gene encodes a cytochrome p450 enzyme catalysis the generation of dafachronic acid (a steroid hormone) in the worm Caenorhabditis elegans, with the CYP Symbol CYP22A1 (Cytochrome P450, family 22, member A1). After generation, dafachronic acid will binding it's nuclear receptor Daf-12 and has been implicated by Cynthia Kenyon and colleagues related to the formation of Dauer larva.

References 

Caenorhabditis elegans genes
22